Methia debilis is a species of beetle in the family Cerambycidae. It was described by Horn in 1895.

References

Methiini
Beetles described in 1895